Jayam Manadera is a 2000 Indian Telugu-language action drama film directed by N. Shankar and produced by D. Suresh Babu under the Suresh Productions banner. It stars Venkatesh, Soundarya and Bhanupriya, with music composed by Vandemataram Srinivas. The film was successful at the box office. The film won two Nandi Awards and one Filmfare Award. The film was also remade in Tamil as Manikanda.

Plot
Abhiram is a fun-loving man who stays with his parents in London. Eight people win the Thumbs Up contest which gives them an opportunity to tour Europe. Uma is one of the contest winners. Abhiram likes Uma and acts as their tour companion during their stay in Europe. A shy Uma could not express her love towards him, so she leaves a message in his answering machine. But Abhiram could not listen to the message at the right time. Hence, Uma presumes that Abhiram does not love her and returns to India with her companions. But Abhiram hears the message after Uma left, and calls her. But it's too late for him, as Uma's father arranges his daughter's marriage with Jasjit, the brother of the main villain.

Meanwhile, Jasjit and his gang of goons are searching for a persona named Mahadeva Naidu. When Subramanyam's father sees the photograph of Abhiram, he feels frightened and approaches Narasimha Naidu. Narasimha wants to eliminate Mahadeva Naidu. When Abhiram discovers that Uma may be forcibly married to another man, he goes to her village to elope with her. Just when he reaches the railway station, a gang that is after his life chases him and Uma, but the couple evade the goons and flee. They are saved by Bhavani (Jhansi) in the nick of time. She takes him to a hideout where a group of people are hiding.

They explain to him about his past. He is the son of Mahadeva Naidu (also Venkatesh), who was the savior of the Dalits (untouchables) and downtrodden people of Karamchedu. He liberated the Dalits in that area and he was killed by the villains, who are none other than his relatives. Rudrama Naidu (son) and Jhansi (daughter) are taken away by Mahadeva Naidu's lieutenants so that they can be saved. Mahadeva Naidu swears that his son Rudrama Naidu would come back to destroy the villains and save the poor people. Rudrama Naidu, who was raised as Abhiraam, learns about his past and the rest of the film is about his revenge.

Cast

 Venkatesh as Mahadeva Naidu and Rudraman Naidu / Abhiram (dual role)
 Soundarya as Uma
 Bhanupriya as Bhuvaneswari
 Jaya Prakash Reddy as Narasimha Naidu
 Atul Kulkarni as Basavayah
 Jhansi as Bhavani
 Brahmanandam as Krupakaram
 Ali
 Tanikella Bharani as Malesh Yadav
 M. S. Narayana as Lingam
 AVS as Sonthi Paramahamsa
 L. B. Sriram as Mathayah
 Ahuti Prasad as Gangadharam Naidu
 Prasad Babu as Subramanyam
 Meena Kumari as Maheswari
 Kolla Ashok Kumar as Vyakuntha Naidu
 Banerjee as Kesava Naidu
 Ravi Babu as Ravindra Naidu
 Surya as Purushothama Naidu
 Raja Ravindra as Damodara Naidu
 Ashok Kumar as Priest
 Rama Prabha as Uma's Bamma
 Venniradi Nirmala as Parvathi
 Hema as Chandramma
 Priya as Uma's friend
 Narsingh Yadav as Police Officer
 Siva Parvathi as Narasimha Naidu's mother
 Indu Anand as Narasima Naidu's wife
 Ramyasri as Kesava Naidu's wife
 Gadiraju Subba Rao as Villager
 Satya Prakash as Janardhan Naidu
 Navabharat Balaji as Suridu 
 Harika as Rangamma
 Bangalore Padma 
 Sumalata 
 Shobha
 Sunitha
 Srija
 Sweety

Production
The film began production under the name Rudrama Naidu.

Soundtrack

Music composed by Vandemataram Srinivas. Music released on ADITYA Music Company.

Awards
Filmfare Awards South
 Best Actor - Telugu - Venkatesh (2000).

Nandi Awards - 2000
 Best Villain - Jaya Prakash Reddy
 Best Supporting Actress - Jhansi

Release
The film released with 114 prints in 149 centres.

Box office
The film collected a distributors' share of Rs. 12 crore in its lifetime theatrical run, and a distributors' share of Rs. 3.04 crore in its opening week.

References

2000s Telugu-language films
2000 action drama films
2000 films
Indian action drama films
Films set in Telangana
Telugu films remade in other languages
Films directed by N. Shankar
Films set in Andhra Pradesh
Films shot in Andhra Pradesh
Suresh Productions films